Lupatelli is an Italian surname. Notable people with the surname include:

Antonio Lupatelli (1930-2018), Italian illustrator
Cristiano Lupatelli (born 1978), Italian footballer

Lupattelli
 Angelo Lupattelli - Art historian for Umbria, publishing in late 19th, early 20th-centuries.

Italian-language surnames